Holland 3 was a Royal Navy submarine launched on 9 May 1902. The submarine was designed by Vickers at Barrow-in-Furness and was laid down on 4 February 1901. The submarine was commissioned on 1 August 1902. Holland 3 sank in trials in 1911 and was then sold on 7 October 1913.

Service history
In early August 1902 John Alfred Moreton was appointed to the submarine depot ship HMS Hazard, to take command of HM Submarine No.3.

However, by the time she was launched she was already considered obsolete and thirteen A-class submarines had already been ordered.

References

External links
 MaritimeQuest HMS Holland 3 Pages

Holland-class submarines
Royal Navy ship names
Ships built in Barrow-in-Furness
1902 ships